The Church of Jesus Christ of Latter-day Saints in Portugal refers to the Church of Jesus Christ of Latter-day Saints (LDS Church) and its members in Portugal. As of 2021, the LDS Church reported 45,675 members in 62 congregations in Portugal, making it the third largest body of LDS Church members in Europe behind the United Kingdom and Spain. In 2019, Portugal had the most LDS Church members per capita in Europe. Nearly all members are native Portuguese or permanent immigrants from former Portuguese territories.

History

The first meetings of the LDS Church in Portugal were among members of U.S. armed forces stationed in the country in early 1970. In April 1974, the mostly peaceful Carnation Revolution brought an end to decades of authoritarian rule that had formally promoted Roman Catholicism and had restricted other faiths from proselyting. Several weeks after the fall of this Estado Novo regime, church president Spencer W. Kimball visited Portugal and received confirmation that the LDS Church would be recognized and that the missionaries could start preaching in the country.

In November 1974, William Grant Bangerter of the Quorum of the Seventy came to Lisbon to preside over the newly created Portugal Lisbon Mission. Four Portuguese-speaking missionaries were transferred to the new mission from Brazil. The first official meetings of the LDS Church were held at the home of a member of the Canadian embassy who lived in Portugal.

By July 1975, there were already about 100 Portuguese Latter-day Saints, and by July 1978, membership reached 1,000. The church's growth has steadily progressed since that time; at year-end 2016, more than 38,000 Mormons live in Portugal, organized in dozens of local congregations known as wards and branches.

Relationship with the media
The LDS Church uses a religious programming space provided on channel RTP 2 in conjunction with other religious denominations. This opportunity is made possible under Portugal's religious freedom laws. It consists of two programs, the seven-minute "People of Faith" and the 30-minute "Paths". A number of radio programs are also provided on station RDP in formats similar to television programming.

Stakes
As of February 2023, the LDS Church has 7 Stakes and a District in Portugal:

Missions
Portugal Lisbon Mission

Temples
The Lisbon Portugal Temple was announced on 2 October 2010 by church president Thomas S. Monson. Its ceremonial groundbreaking services were held on 5 December 2015, with Patrick Kearon, president of the church's Europe Area, presiding.

See also
Church of Christ (Latter Day Saints)
Religion in Portugal

References

External links
LDS Newsroom - Portugal
The Church of Jesus Christ of Latter-day Saints Official site (Portugal)
 ComeUntoChrist.org Latter-day Saints Visitor site